This is a list of football clubs in Finland.

League listings

 Championship - Veikkausliiga
 Division 1 - Ykkönen
 Division 2 - Kakkonen
 Division 3 - Kolmonen 
 Division 4 - Nelonen  
 Division 5 - Vitonen
 Division 6 - Kutonen
 Division 7 - Seiska

Alphabetical listings 

Contents: A  B  C  D  E  F  G  H  I  J  K  L  M  N  O  P  Q  R  S  T  U  V  W  X  Y  Z  Å  Ä  Ö

K

Footnotes

References 

K